The Ministry of Foreign Affairs of Belize is the government ministry of Belize which oversees foreign relations of the country.

List of ministers
This is a list of Ministers of Foreign Affairs of Belize:

George Cadle Price, 1981–1983
Vernon Harrison Courtenay, 1983–1984
Dean Barrow, 1984–1989
Said Musa, 1989–1993
Dean Barrow, 1993–1998
Said Musa, 1998–2002
Assad Shoman, 2002–2003
Godfrey Smith, 2003–2006
Eamon Courtenay, 2006–2007
Lisa Shoman, 2007–2008
Wilfred Elrington, 2008–2020
Eamon Courtenay, 2020–present

See also

Cabinet of Belize
List of prime ministers of Belize

References

External links
Ministry of Foreign Affairs

Foreign Affairs
Foreign relations of Belize
Belize